The Kuznetsov NK-144 is an afterburning turbofan engine made by the Soviet Kuznetsov Design Bureau. Used on the early models of the Tupolev Tu-144 supersonic aircraft, it was very inefficient and was replaced with the Kolesov RD-36-51 turbojet engine.

Specifications

References

External links

 NK-144 on LeteckeMotory.cz (Czech)

NK-144
Low-bypass turbofan engines
1960s turbofan engines